Cornufer gilliardi, commonly known as Gilliard's wrinkled ground frog, is a species of frog in the family Ceratobatrachidae. It is endemic to the Whiteman Ranges of New Britain, Bismarck Archipelago (Papua New Guinea). The specific name gilliardi honors Ernest Thomas Gilliard, an American ornithologist who, together with Margaret Gilliard, collected the holotype .

Taxonomy
Cornufer gilliardi was originally described as Platymantis gilliardi based on holotype from New Britain and paratypes from the Admiralty Archipelago. Later research has shown that the Admiralty Archipelago specimens represent other species, Platymantis latro (now Cornufer latro), and that the range of Cornufer gilliardi is restricted to New Britain.

Description
The tympanum and the supratympanic fold are moderately distinct. The eyes are relatively large. The fingers have lateral fringes but no discs. The toes have small terminal discs. The preserved specimen is dorsally gray-brown, slightly paler between the convergent dorsal folds. The chest and abdomen are pale and nearly immaculate.

Habitat and conservation
The ecology of Cornufer gilliardi is poorly known. It is probably a foothill species occurring in rainforest habitats. Development is direct (i.e., there is no free-living larval stage) and the eggs are laid on the ground.

The very extensive logging taking place within its range is a possible threat.

References

gilliardi
Amphibians of Papua New Guinea
Endemic fauna of Papua New Guinea
Fauna of New Britain
Amphibians described in 1960
Taxa named by Richard G. Zweifel
Taxonomy articles created by Polbot